Patrick Deering (born 2 February 1967) is a former Irish Fine Gael politician who served as a Teachta Dála (TD) for the Carlow–Kilkenny constituency from 2011 to 2020. He served as Chair of the Committee on Agriculture, Food and the Marine 2016 to 2020.

Before he ran for election to Dáil Éireann, Deering served for a number of years as chairman of the Carlow GAA County Board. He was a member of Carlow County Council for the Tullow local electoral area from 2009 to 2011.

Deering was elected Vice Chair of the Fine Gael Parliamentary Party on 8 June 2016, supporting Kildare South TD Martin Heydon in his role as Chair.

He lost his seat at the 2020 general election. He also unsuccessfully contested the 2020 Seanad election.

References

External links

Pat Deering's page on the Fine Gael website

 

1967 births
Living people
Alumni of Athlone Institute of Technology
Carlow County Board administrators
Chairmen of county boards of the Gaelic Athletic Association
Fine Gael TDs
Irish farmers
Irish sportsperson-politicians
Local councillors in County Carlow
Members of the 31st Dáil
Members of the 32nd Dáil